North Eastern Institute of Ayurveda & Homoeopathy (NEIAH) is an autonomous institute under the Ministry of AYUSH, within the government of India. It is situated at Mawdiangdiang, Shillong, Meghalaya. It was formally inaugurated by Union Minister of State for Ayush Shripad Yesso Naik on 22 December 2016. Now from session 2019-20 seats have been increased to 63 per year for both the colleges.

The Institute offers a five and a half year course in Bachelor of Ayurvedic Medicine and Surgery and Bachelor of Homeopathic Medicine and Surgery including one year of compulsory internship.

References

External links
 Official website

Universities and colleges in Meghalaya
Medical colleges in Meghalaya
Education in Shillong
Research institutes in Meghalaya
Ayurvedic colleges
Homeopathic colleges
2015 establishments in Meghalaya
Research institutes established in 2015